The Minister of Jerusalem Affairs and Heritage is an occasional portfolio in the Israeli cabinet. It was first established under the government of Yitzhak Shamir on 27 November 1990, with Avraham Verdiger serving as deputy minister, although Avner Shaki had served as a Minister without Portfolio responsible for Jerusalem Affairs since 1988. However, the post was scrapped by Prime Minister Yitzhak Rabin (who was also the portfolio holder) on 31 December 1992.

It was resurrected in 2001 in Ariel Sharon's government. In 2005 the role reverted to being the responsibility of a Minister without Portfolio. Between 2013 and 2015 it was combined with the Diaspora Affairs portfolio as the Minister of Diaspora as the Minister of Jerusalem and Diaspora Affairs.

List of ministers

Deputy ministers

References

1990 establishments in Israel
Lists of government ministers of Israel
Affairs and Heritage Minister of Israel
Affairs and Heritage Minister of Israel